Alfred James Davey (29 March 1888 – 2 October 1961) was a New Zealand politician of the National Party. He was a farmer in South Canterbury and involved in many community organisations.

Biography

Davey was born on 29 March 1888 in Rangatira Valley inland from Temuka. After school, he farmed in nearby Waitohi. Davey was involved in many community groups in South Canterbury. With the Farmers' Union, he presided over the Temuka branch for many years, belonged to the executive of the South Canterbury district, and was its representative on the Dominion executive. Davey held a directorship on the Midland Dairy Company. He had a particular interest in education. He is the author of histories of the Geraldine County and of the Timaru Choral Society. He was elected onto Geraldine County Council in the 1938 New Zealand local elections. He subsequently became chairperson of the county council for 10 years and a member of the Timaru Harbour Board for 13 years.

Davey was a member of the Presbyterian Church in Timaru and active as an elder at St Paul's church in the Timaru suburb of Highfield.

In 1953, he was awarded the Queen Elizabeth II Coronation Medal.

Davey sought the Timaru National Party candidacy for the  but was beaten by Ronald Erle White, a former mayor of Timaru.

Davey died on 2 October 1961 in Timaru.

Footnotes

Notes

References

1886 births
1961 deaths
New Zealand National Party MPs
Members of the New Zealand House of Representatives
New Zealand MPs for South Island electorates
Unsuccessful candidates in the 1957 New Zealand general election
People from South Canterbury